Hong Kong's rail network mainly comprises public transport trains operated by the MTR Corporation Limited (MTRC). The MTRC operates the metro network of the territory and the commuter rail network connecting the northeastern, northwestern and southwestern New Territories to the urban areas. The operations of the territory's two leading railway companies, MTRC and the Kowloon-Canton Railway Corporation (KCRC), were merged in 2007  The Hong Kong Government has an explicit stated transport policy of using railways as its transport backbone.

In addition to the MTR network, there are several smaller-scale railways run by different operators, including the Peak Tram and the Hong Kong Tramways, and other systems including the Disneyland Railroad and the Ocean Express.

History

The first mode of rail transport for the public in Hong Kong was the Peak Tram, serving The Peak (at Victoria Gap), the Mid-Levels and the city centre since 1888. This was followed by the Mount Parker Cable Car in 1892, but this system was terminated in 1932 and dismantled. The tram started service along the northern coast of the Hong Kong Island in 1904. The British Section of the Kowloon–Canton Railway (later the KCR East Rail, and now the East Rail line), a conventional railway, was opened in 1910.

It was not until 1979 that a rapid transit system, the MTR, was opened. Three years later, the British Section of the Kowloon–Canton Railway began its transition towards electrification, which changed it into a commuter rail, and eventually providing rapid transit-like service. The Light Rail Transit (LRT, now the MTR Light Rail) began its operation in the Tuen Mun and Yuen Long new towns in 1988. The two railway companies, MTR Corporation Limited and Kowloon-Canton Railway Corporation, merged their operations in 2007 to form a single rapid transit network, with the KCRC granting the MTRCL a service concession to operate their KCR network.

In 2018, the Guangzhou-Shenzhen-Hong Kong High Speed Railway opened to connect Hong Kong with the Mainland Chinese high speed network through a  tunnel within Hong Kong to West Kowloon station. It has many train services to many Mainland Chinese cities such as Beijing, Guangzhou and Shenzhen, until service was suspended since midnight of 30 January 2020 amidst the coronavirus pandemic.

There are several extensions planned, such as Tung Chung West station and North Island line.

Trams and funiculars 

 
  Hong Kong Tramways: Double-decker trams, running on the north shore of Hong Kong Island from Kennedy Town to Shau Kei Wan.
 Peak Tram: A funicular railway with six stations, connecting Central and the Victoria Peak.
 Po Fook Hill Elevator: A funicular railway with two stations, connecting the car park and the upper section of Po Fook Hill Cemetery.
 Discovery Bay Elevator: A funicular railway with two stations, connecting Discovery Bay North Plaza and Amalfi.
 Ocean Express
 Between Tai Wo Hau Road and Wo Tong Tsui Street in Kwai Chung
Note that the MTRC Light Rail system (see below) has many of the attributes of a tramway, including street running on some of its sections (while having its own right-of-way on others.).

MTR 

 

Including lines owned and most of which previously operated by the KCR Corporation, the MTR network for local service comprises 10 lines, 97 railway stations and 68 Light Rail stops:

 : between Lo Wu/Lok Ma Chau and Admiralty  (formerly part of KCR/KCRC)
 : between Whampoa and Tiu Keng Leng
 : between Tsuen Wan and Central
 : between Kennedy Town and Chai Wan
 : between Admiralty and South Horizons
 : between Tung Chung and Hong Kong
 : between Po Lam/LOHAS Park and North Point
 : between Sunny Bay and Disneyland Resort
 : between Wu Kai Sha to Tuen Mun  (formerly part of KCR/KCRC for Wu Kai Sha to Tai Wai section, and Hung Hom to Tuen Mun section; remainder owned by the government through the KCRC following an injection of assets)
 : between AsiaWorld-Expo/Airport and Hong Kong
  : 68 stations serving the northwest New Territories (formerly part of KCR/KCRC)

This system makes about HK$2 billion in profit in 2014 which is mainly generated from its property holding and development business. Its portfolio include two of the city's tallest skyscrapers.

Cross-border services

Through trains

Commonly known as through train (chi. 直通車), the MTRC and railway companies of mainland China jointly provided cross-border train services from Hung Hom station, Kowloon, sharing most of the tracks with the East Rail line, to destinations in mainland China through neighbouring Shenzhen on three Through Train routes, namely Beijing line (to/from Beijing West), Shanghai line (to/from Shanghai) and Guangdong line (to/from Guangzhou East); these services have been suspended since the beginning of the coronavirus pandemic from 30 January 2020 onwards. The Through Train service to Guangzhou (formerly Canton) was a legacy of Hong Kong's first railway, the Kowloon–Canton Railway. Outside Hong Kong it was operated through the rail network in mainland China, including the Guangshen railway, Jingguang railway and Hukun railway.

High speed rail

A high-speed rail link connects Hong Kong with Shenzhen and Guangzhou in mainland China.  The Hong Kong section of the Guangzhou–Shenzhen–Hong Kong Express Rail Link (sometimes abbreviated "XRL HK section") is a 26-km long stretch of high-speed rail that links Hong Kong to mainland China. The Hong Kong section opened for commercial service on 23 September 2018. From West Kowloon Terminus, trains run through regional stations in Guandong Province, including Futian, Longhua (Shenzhen North), and Humen, to Guangzhou South station and other cities in other provinces.

With the completion of the rail link, the journey times have been reduced to 14 minutes between West Kowloon and Futian stations, 23 minutes between Hong Kong and Shenzhen North and 48 minutes between Hong Kong and Guangzhou South. The service is a cooperation between the MTR Corporation and CR Guangzhou.

West Kowloon station is served by both short-distance and long-haul train services. Short-distance services consist of a frequent service to mainland Chinese cities in neighbouring Guangdong province, including Shenzhen, Dongguan and Guangzhou, while long-distance services link Hong Kong to at least 16 major destinations in mainland China, including Beijing West, Shijiazhuang, Zhengzhou East, Wuhan, Changsha South and Shanghai Hongqiao.

A new railway connecting Guangzhou, Shenzhen and Hong Kong was proposed in the late 1990s by the Government of Hong Kong. This Regional Express Railway (RER) proposal was developed in the 1994 “Railway Development Study” (RDS); it foresaw a continual growth of Hong Kong's population over the next two decades and strong demand for cross-border passenger traffic.  By 2002, the concept of “regional express” gained further development and the proposal was advanced to be a high-speed rail line.  Construction of the Hong Kong section began in 2010. Following delays and controversies, West Kowloon station was formally opened on 4 September 2018 and high speed trains started to run on the rail link to destinations in Mainland China from 23 September 2018.

A second cross-border express railway, the Hong Kong–Shenzhen Western Express Railway, was proposed in the 2000s but shelved amidst concern over costs and the environment. The shelved proposal has been revived in October 2021 by the territory's then Chief Executive.

Higher-speed capacity 
Apart from the XRL mentioned above, MTR's trainsets for the Guangdong service, namely Lok 2000 locomotives and its carriages the Ktt, are designed to be able to run at  but do not operate at those speeds on the tracks of the East Rail. The SP1900 EMUs (IKK trains; in reference to the Itochu, Kinki Sharyo and Kawasaki consortium) on the Tuen Ma line and formerly on the East Rail may run at  but also do not operate at those speeds on those lines.

Automated People Mover

There is an Automated People Mover (APM), a driverless electric train service, which is located at the basement level of Terminal 1 of Hong Kong International Airport. It travels the length of the  concourse between the East Hall and West Hall on a circular mode. Running at a speed of 62 km per hour, each APM carries 304 passengers in four cars. The APM operates every 2.5 minutes from 0600 to 0030 hours every day. It transports passengers whose flights are located at the West Hall, Southwest and Northwest concourses.

An Automated People Mover was also proposed by the territory's Chief Executive to connect , Lau Fau Shan and Pak Nai in northwestern New Territories by the Deep Bay. An elevated trackless tram system was proposed for hilly northeastern New Kowloon.

Other minor systems
 Ocean Park Cable Car
 Hong Kong Disneyland Railroad
 Ngong Ping 360 (a bicable gondola lift owned and operated by MTRCL)
 A track inside the Fire and Ambulance Services Academy

Rail gauges and power supply

Rail gauges and power supply of Hong Kong rails.

List of densely populated places without rail transport
 Hong Kong Island
 Aberdeen
 Wah Fu
 Bel-Air Residence
 Pok Fu Lam
 Siu Sai Wan
 Kowloon
 Most of Tai Wo Ping (Shek Kip Mei)
 Tsz Wan Shan
 Sau Mau Ping and Shun Lee
 Most of San Po Kong
 New Territories
 Chai Wan Kok
 Sheung Kwai Chung 
 Sai Kung
 So Kwun Wat
 Tsuen King Circuit
 Parts of Tsing Yi
 Tuen Mun Pierhead

MTR route map

Former systems
Mount Parker Cable Car
  Monorail
Lai Chi Kok Amusement Park Monorail
 Miniature railway in Luna Park, Fortress Hill
 Tracks inside the Kowloon Wharves
 Tracks inside the Taikoo Dockyard
 Tracks inside the Whampoa Docks
 Cement works in To Kwa Wan
 Haematite mine at Ma On Shan
 Tracks in the Victoria Barracks
 Tracks near Tai Tam Tuk Raw Water Pumping Station
 Praya East Reclamation Railway
 Waglan Island
 Sham Shui Po Camp
 Diary Farm Ropeway in Pok Fu Lam
 Nazareth House Ropeway in Pok Fu Lam

See also

Transport in Hong Kong § Rail transport
List of railway lines in China
Rail transport in China
Rail transport in Macau

References

External links 
我們未來的鐵路